Bae Yoo-na (born 30 November 1989) is a South Korean volleyball player. She was part of the South Korea women's national volleyball team at the 2006 FIVB Volleyball Women's World Championship in Japan, and 2007 FIVB Volleyball Women's World Cup.
She played with GS Caltex.

Club career
 Played with GS Caltex Seoul KIXX (2007-2016)
 Played with Gimcheon Korea Expressway Hi-pass (2017- )

International career
2014 Asian Games
Team:

References

External links
Bae Yoo-na at fivb.org
Bae Yoo-na at Korea Volleyball Federation 

1989 births
Living people
South Korean women's volleyball players
Asian Games medalists in volleyball
Asian Games gold medalists for South Korea
People from Ansan
Volleyball players at the 2014 Asian Games
Volleyball players at the 2006 Asian Games
Volleyball players at the 2016 Summer Olympics
Olympic volleyball players of South Korea
Medalists at the 2014 Asian Games
Sportspeople from Gyeonggi Province